National Lampoon's Adam & Eve, also known simply as Adam & Eve, is a 2005 American comedy film, released as part of the ongoing series of National Lampoon films. The film is directed by Jeff Kanew and stars Cameron Douglas, Emmanuelle Chriqui, George Dzundza and others.

Plot 
Adam is a college senior and an aspiring singer/songwriter. He meets Eve, a beautiful, bright student and talented sports still photographer. They begin dating and Adam is surprised to learn that Eve is still a virgin because she does not wish to have sex until it feels right for her.

Cast 
Cameron Douglas as Adam
Emmanuelle Chriqui as Eve
Chad Lindberg as Freddie
Jake Hoffman as Ferguson
Brian Klugman as Munch
Branden Williams as Billy
Courtney Peldon as Patty
China Shavers as Sarah
Lisa Wilhoit as Katie Wilson
Terri Garber as Eve's mother
Allan Havey as Adam's father
George Dzundza as Eve's father
Brianna Brown as Cindy
Joshua Wade as Miles
Gary Brockette as Miles' boss

External links
 
 

2005 comedy films
2005 films
American comedy films
2000s English-language films
Films directed by Jeff Kanew
Adam and Eve
New Line Cinema films
2000s American films